Michèle Peyron (born 22 July 1961) is a French politician of La République En Marche! (LREM) and Territories of Progress (TDP) who has been serving as a member of the French National Assembly since the 2017 elections, representing the department of Seine-et-Marne.

Political career
In the 1995 municipal elections, Peyron first became a town councillor in Var, at the time representing the Socialist Party (PS). In May 2016, she joined En Marche! and became head of the movement's local branch in Seine-et-Marne.

In parliament, Peyron serves as member of the Committee on Social Affairs. In addition to her committee assignments, she is part of the French-Vietnamese Parliamentary Friendship Group. In 2018, she also joined a parliamentary working group on the G5 Sahel, which is studying how to help Burkina Faso, Chad, Mali, Mauritania and Niger confront terrorist groups in their region. 

In March 2020, LREM group chairman Gilles Le Gendre appointed Peyron and Mickaël Nogal as the parliamentary majority's rapporteurs on economic and health emergency measures amid the COVID-19 pandemic in France. In 2020, Peyron joined En commun (EC), a group within LREM led by Barbara Pompili.

Political positions
In a 2017 parliamentary debate on extending immunization coverage in France, Peyron publicly recounted her personal experience of losing a child at birth in 1986 due to lack of prior immunization.

Personal life
Peyron has two children.

See also
 2017 French legislative election

References

1961 births
Living people
People from Nîmes
Socialist Party (France) politicians
La République En Marche! politicians
Territories of Progress politicians
Deputies of the 15th National Assembly of the French Fifth Republic
Deputies of the 16th National Assembly of the French Fifth Republic
Members of Parliament for Seine-et-Marne
Women members of the National Assembly (France)
21st-century French women politicians